"Party Girl" is a song by American rapper StaySolidRocky, originally self-released on September 12, 2019, and then re-released by Columbia Records on April 21, 2020, as his third career-single. The song went viral on video-sharing app TikTok and became StaySolidRocky's first charting single. It was written by the rapper and its producer Nashi. The track was later included on his debut EP [[Fallin' (EP)|Fallin']], released July 17, 2020. A remix with rapper Lil Uzi Vert was released on July 10, 2020.

Background
StaySolidRocky first previewed the song in an Instagram post on July 10, 2019. The track was met with positive feedback, which prompted the rapper to record the song at a friend's house, whereafter it was uploaded to SoundCloud. Rocky also recorded a music video, financed by himself. The song soon gained popularity on video-sharing app TikTok, whereafter it amassed millions of views on YouTube. Although "Party Girl" was originally released in September 2019, after being recorded at a friend's house, the song was officially re-released on April 21, 2020, after StaySolidRocky secured a recording deal with Columbia Records in early 2020.

Composition
StaySolidRocky wrote the song in July 2019. It is loosely based on a relationship he had. Conceptually, "Party Girl" is a "love-drunk" track, finding the rapper "fishing for romance with a rowdy partygoer". The song contains "somber" keys with, as described by Billboards Carl Lamarre, "IG caption-worthy lyrics like, 'They say you ain't wifey type, but I don't care I want you'. The song also references Cyndi Lauper's "Girls Just Want To Have Fun".

Critical reception
Carl Lamarre of Billboard opined that, lyrically, the song raised StaySolidRocky's profile - "as not only a lovestruck teen but a promising hitmaker".

Commercial performance
The song gained traction in April 2020, and a month later it was added to various Spotify playlists, aiding in its streams going from thousands to millions. In the week ending April 30, 2020, "Party Girl" debuted at number 84 on the Billboard Hot 100, thanks to 8.2 million streams the previous week. It has since peaked at number 21.

Music video
The music video, which StaySolidRocky financed himself, was shot in December 2019. He recalled: "I was aiming for like 50 thousand views 'cause that was my first music video. That was the first music video I ever did".

TikTok dance
Over 8 million videos have been made on TikTok using the song as of June 2020, with over 3 billion plays. Popular TikTok users like Charli D'Amelio, who at the time was the most-followed individual on the platform, helped to popularize the song on the platform. These videos usually consist of users dancing to a snippet of the song. It was the second top TikTok song for May 2020.

Charts

Weekly charts

Year-end charts

Certifications

Lil Uzi Vert remix

The song's official remix, with Lil Uzi Vert, was released on July 10, 2020.

CompositionBillboards Carl Lamarre opined that on the remix, the rappers "overlook their girls' sexual conquests and combustible affairs to secure long-lasting relationships". Jordan Rose of Complex noted the rappers' melodic sound and how StaySolidRocky wears his heart on his sleeve, while giving "teenage angst a loftier sound, as he and Uzi bounce off each other seamlessly".

Critical reception
Carl Lamarre of Billboard found that the two work well together, writing: "Even if their admirable pursuits prove futile, you have to admire their chemistry on this retouched heater". Complex''s Jordan Rose said "Uzi brought [their] talents", which he felt "is sure to only make the remix to 'Party Girl' balloon to the same heights as its original".

References

2020 singles
2019 songs
StaySolidRocky songs
Columbia Records singles
Songs written by Lil Uzi Vert
Lil Uzi Vert songs